Yandro Miguel Quintana Rivalta (born January 30, 1980 in Ciego de Ávila) is a Cuban wrestler who competed in the Men's Freestyle 60 kg at the 2004 Summer Olympics which were also his first Olympics. He won the gold medal by defeating Masuod Jokar in the final with the help of his coach Filberto Delgado. He stands 5'2 and 132 lbs. In 2003 he came in first at the Pan American Games. He now resides in Havana, Cuba.

External links
 
 

1980 births
Living people
People from Ciego de Ávila
Wrestlers at the 2004 Summer Olympics
Wrestlers at the 2007 Pan American Games
Wrestlers at the 2008 Summer Olympics
Olympic wrestlers of Cuba
Olympic gold medalists for Cuba
Olympic medalists in wrestling
Medalists at the 2004 Summer Olympics
Cuban male sport wrestlers
Pan American Games gold medalists for Cuba
Pan American Games medalists in wrestling
World Wrestling Championships medalists
Medalists at the 2007 Pan American Games
20th-century Cuban people
21st-century Cuban people